Chana Songkhram is a khwaeng (subdistrict) of Phra Nakhon District, in Bangkok, Thailand. In 2020, it had a total population of 1,776 people.

References

Subdistricts of Bangkok
Phra Nakhon district